The Malta national football team represents Malta in international football and is controlled by the Malta Football Association, the governing body for football in Malta.

The first official game played by Malta was a 3–2 defeat in a friendly against Austria in 1957. Their competitive debut arrived five years later, playing against Denmark in the preliminary round of the 1964 European Nations' Cup. Since becoming a UEFA member in 1960 and a FIFA member in 1959, Malta have competed in every qualifier for the European Championship and World Cup, but have never made it to the finals of any major international competition.

History 

Malta played its first international game on 24 February 1957 at the Empire Stadium, losing 2–3 to Austria. That match was played in front of a capacity crowd at the old Empire Stadium. The Malta Football Association joined FIFA in 1959 and UEFA a year later. However, in late 1959, Malta played in the 1960 Summer Olympics African Qualifiers against Morocco and Tunisia, in which they finished last in the group with two draws and two losses. Since then, Malta has largely maintained the status as one of Europe's weakest teams, though its fortunes have increased since late 2010s.

The Maltese international side first competed in the qualifying rounds of the UEFA European Nations Cup in 1962, and in FIFA World Cup qualification in 1971. Malta's first competitive draw ended 1–1 against Greece in 1970. Malta's first two competitive wins were victories of 2–0 and 2–1 at home to Greece and Iceland in European Championship qualifiers in 1975 and 1982 respectively. In 1979, Malta drew 0–0 with West Germany in a European championship qualifier and they met again on 16 December 1984 for a memorable World Cup Qualifier in front of a record attendance at the Ta'Qali stadium, where the 1982 & eventual 1986 World Cup runners-up only managed a 2–3 win. Another prestigious result was achieved in March 1987 when Malta drew 2–2 in Portugal, in a qualifier for Euro'88 and the side also twice drew against Hungary during the qualification for the 1990 FIFA World Cup, and recorded four friendly wins during 1991 and 1992.

Malta's third competitive win came with a 1–0 victory away to Estonia in a 1993 World Cup qualifier in which Kris Laferla scored.
In October 1994 Malta held Czech Republic 0–0 in a qualifier for the UEFA Euro 1996, in which the latter ended runners-up. Six years later, in October 2000, in a group qualifying match for the 2002 World Cup, once again Malta managed another 0–0 draw vs Czech Republic which eventually cost the latter a place at the following major tournament. In June 2000, Malta played England, then managed by Kevin Keegan. Trailing 2–1 going into the final minutes, Malta were awarded a penalty, however David Carabott's effort was saved by Richard Wright. Through November 2001 and May 2002, Malta played and remained undefeated in 6 international matches and in between they won the locally hosted (Rothmans) International Tournament. During 2005, Malta drew 1–1 against Croatia and Bulgaria. Another positive result was the 1–1 home draw in a friendly match against Northern Ireland, though George Mallia missed an injury time penalty which would have given them a win. On 11 October 2006, Malta managed another competitive victory, a 2–1 triumph over Hungary in the European Championship qualifying with André Schembri scoring twice.

On 7 February 2007, Malta drew 1–1 with one of the hosts of Euro 2008, Austria. The game was played to commemorate the 50th anniversary of the first international match played by the Maltese national team. On 8 September 2007, Malta managed another draw against Turkey in a Euro 2008 qualifying match, the game finishing 2–2. On 26 March 2008, Malta achieved its largest ever victory, a 7–1 defeat of Liechtenstein in a friendly at the Ta' Qali Stadium, with Michael Mifsud scoring five goals. A 2–0 friendly win over Georgia followed in 2009.

In May 2010, sponsorship of the Maltese national side was taken on by sportswear firm Givova, who also designed a range of new kits for the team. One month later, however, the side had fallen to their lowest ever FIFA world ranking position, of 169th in the world. In 2009, Malta had a 0–0 draw with Albania at home. This was their only point for the 2010 World Cup qualifying. On 11 August 2010, Malta drew 1–1 at home against FYR Macedonia in a friendly game, with Michael Mifsud scoring a brilliant diving header for Malta.

In February 2011, the national football team of Malta achieved a 0–0 draw against Switzerland, in which goalkeeper Justin Haber saved two penalties. On 6 September 2011, Malta won their first Euro 2012 qualifying point, with a 1–1 draw against Georgia. During the years of 2010 and 2011, Malta did not get many positive results, and coach John Buttigieg and assistant coach Carmel Busittil were both sacked in October 2011. For the 2014 FIFA World Cup qualification campaign, Malta won their first World Cup qualifying match in 20 years, nabbing a 1–0 win over Armenia in June 2013. In June 2017, Malta defeated Ukraine 1–0 in a friendly match, thanks to a lone goal by defender Zach Muscat. Malta recorded their 7th all-time competitive win (and their first in the UEFA Nations League) on October 13, 2020, defeating Latvia 1–0 in Riga, scoring the winning goal in the 97th minute.

Kits

Results and fixtures 

The following is a list of match results in the last 12 months, as well as any future matches that have been scheduled.

2022

2023

Coaching staff

Coaching history

Players

Current squad 
 The following 31 players were called-up for the UEFA Euro 2024 qualifying matches
 Match dates: 23 and 26 March 2023
 Opposition:  and 
Caps and goals correct as of: 17 November 2022, after the match against

Recent call-ups 
The following players have been called up within the last 12 months.

INJ Player is injured
COV Withdrew due to covid
PRE Preliminary squad / standby
RET Retired from the national team
SUS Serving suspension
WD Player withdrew from the squad due to non-injury issue.

Player records 

Players in bold are still active with Malta.

Most capped players

Top goalscorers

Competitive record

FIFA World Cup

UEFA European Championship

UEFA Nations League

Other records

Head-to-head record

FIFA rankings

See also
Malta International Football Tournament

References

External links 

 Official site of the Malta Football Association
 RSSSF archive of results from 1957
 Reports for all matches of the Maltese national football team

 
European national association football teams